Vitalyst (formerly known as PC Helps) is a technology support services company offering  application and device support for about 150 different software applications and computers. Core competencies include support for corporate technology migrations, and one-on-one support for Microsoft software and other applications different types of devices.

Overview
Vitalyst's corporate headquarters is located in Bala Cynwyd, Pennsylvania, with an additional call center in Cleveland, Ohio. The company provides its web-based support and on-site training for Microsoft, Apple and other applications. The company provides IT support for technology migrations to governmental entities, including the Federal Aviation Administration, the United States Department of Transportation, and the U.S. Securities and Exchange Commission.

History
Formed in 1992, originally as PC Helps, the company was based on a business plan written by Jeffrey Becker while attaining his master's degree at the Kellogg School of Management at Northwestern University.  PC Helps undertook an expansion in its early years.  By 1999 PC Helps had grown organically to support over 800,000 users including clients such as PepsiCo, Pitney Bowes, and Campbell Soups. The sale was finalized in September 2005 to private equity firms, GI Partners and Celerity Partners with additional financing provided by D.B. Zwirn. The company changed its name from PC Helps to Vitalyst on January 15, 2014.

References

External links
Official website

Help desk
Business services companies established in 1992
1992 establishments in Pennsylvania
Business services companies of the United States